Stigmella sanguisorbae is a moth of the family Nepticulidae. It is found from Germany and Poland to Switzerland, Austria and Hungary.

The larvae feed on Sanguisorba officinalis. They mine the leaves of their host plant. The mine consists of a gradually widening corridor. At first, it runs along the leaf margin. Then the corridor doubles in width and makes a secondary blotch. Frass can be found over the entire length in a diffuse central line. Pupation takes place outside of the mine.

External links
Fauna Europaea
bladmineerders.nl

Nepticulidae
Moths of Europe
Moths described in 1865